is a Japanese lead film producer formerly of Studio Ghibli and founder of the company Studio Ponoc. He was nominated for the Academy Award for Best Animated Feature in 2014 for The Tale of Princess Kaguya and received a consecutive Oscar nomination at the 88th Academy Awards for When Marnie Was There in the same category.

Filmography
 2004: Howl's Moving Castle (film) 
 2013: The Kingdom of Dreams and Madness
 2013: The Tale of Princess Kaguya
 2014: When Marnie Was There
 2017: Mary and the Witch's Flower
 2018: Modest Heroes
 2021: Tomorrow's Leaves
 2023: The Imaginary

See also
 List of Asian Academy Award winners and nominees 
 Studio Ponoc

References

External links 
 
 

1977 births
Japanese animators
Japanese animated film producers
Japanese film producers
Living people